Ethmostigmus rubripes, the giant centipede, is the largest Australian centipede. It has three subspecies, with substantial variation within each.

Description
Colouration and patterning varies enormously between specimens from different locations, with shades of yellow and orange the commonest. Forms from arid climates are often pale yellow in colour, while those from rainforest habitats are typically dark green or blue. Body proportion also varies with habitat; arid forms are typically very heavily built with proportionally short legs, while their tropical counterparts have longer legs and a lighter build.

Distribution and habitat
It is found in both dry and moist habitats, ranging from tropical rainforest to desert, usually in sheltered places such as under logs, leaf litter and bark, and beneath rocks. It is a solitary, terrestrial and nocturnal predator. It is widely distributed in Australia, where it exhibits the greatest variation, but is also found in the Solomon Islands, New Guinea, Indonesia, and parts of Southeast Asia.

Behaviour

Feeding
E. rubripes is a voracious eater. Insects, snails, worms and even Arachnids are fair game for most individuals. Larger specimens are more than capable of subduing small vertebrates, which are overpowered by a combination of brute strength and the centipede's powerful venom. They have also been observed scavenging on roadkill.

Breeding
The eggs are laid in clusters of roughly thirty, though sometimes fewer than ten or greater than forty, and the mother guards the eggs and hatchlings until after their second moult. The eggs usually take well over a month to develop, and the babies remain with the mother for a few weeks after that.

Venom
The giant centipede has modified legs called forcipules attached to the first body segment, which curve around its head and can deliver venom into its prey. The venom is toxic to both mammals and insects, but does not appear to be strong enough to kill large animals quickly. It can cause severe pain in humans which can last for several days but which can be relieved somewhat by the application of icepacks. Some people report "intense pain", while others claim it is no worse than a wasp sting. There has been at least one reported death from the related centipede species Scolopendra subspinipes in which a young girl was bitten and died.

Footnotes

References
 Wildlife of Tropical North Queensland. 2000. Queensland Museum. 
 Ménez, André et al. "Venom apparatus and toxicity of the centipede Ethmostigmus rubripes (Chilopoda, Scolopendridae)." Journal of Morphology. 2005. Vol. 206, Issue 3, pp. 303–312.
 Cooktown Local News, Issue 307, March 28, 2007, pp. 1 and 11.
 "Is this the nation's biggest centipede?" The Cairns Post. March 30, 2007, pp. 1 and 3.

External links
 Australian Museum online
 Australian Faunal Directory

rubripes
Centipedes of Australia
Arthropods of China
Fauna of Southeast Asia
Animals described in 1840